East Quincy is a census-designated place (CDP) in Plumas County, California, United States. The population was 2,489 at the 2010 census, up from 2,398 at the 2000 census.

Geography
East Quincy is located at  (39.935153, -120.907670).

Climate
East-Quincy is underlain by metasedimentary rock of the Shoo Fly Complex. Its dominant silica-rich clastic material weathers to a stony coarse soil which includes the well or somewhat excessively drained alluvial fan material (mainly Forgay very gravelly sandy loam) on which most of Quincy's businesses and homes have been built. Cultivated land north of the residential area lies on poorly drained loam, silt loam or fine sandy loam.

East-Quincy has a Mediterranean climate (Köppen Csb) though its inland location and altitude makes it more continental and wetter than usual for this type, with very heavy snowfalls sometimes occurring in winter – the record being  in the very wet January 1916. Although summer days are hot and only 1.4 days per winter fail to top , nights can be very cold and frosts occur on 179 days per year and have been recorded even in July.

Demographics

2010
At the 2010 census East Quincy had a population of 2,489. The racial makeup of East Quincy was 2,174 (87.3%) White, 79 (3.2%) African American, 43 (1.7%) Native American, 15 (0.6%) Asian, 0 (0.0%) Pacific Islander, 32 (1.3%) from other races, and 146 (5.9%) from two or more races. Hispanic or Latino of any race were 161 people (6.5%).

The census reported that 2,451 people (98.5% of the population) lived in households, no one lived in non-institutionalized group quarters and 38 (1.5%) were institutionalized.

There were 1,081 households, 299 (27.7%) had children under the age of 18 living in them, 469 (43.4%) were opposite-sex married couples living together, 114 (10.5%) had a female householder with no husband present, 64 (5.9%) had a male householder with no wife present. There were 77 (7.1%) unmarried opposite-sex partnerships, and 11 (1.0%) same-sex married couples or partnerships. 333 households (30.8%) were one person and 102 (9.4%) had someone living alone who was 65 or older. The average household size was 2.27. There were 647 families (59.9% of households); the average family size was 2.78.

The age distribution was 525 people (21.1%) under the age of 18, 261 people (10.5%) aged 18 to 24, 559 people (22.5%) aged 25 to 44, 796 people (32.0%) aged 45 to 64, and 348 people (14.0%) who were 65 or older. The median age was 42.1 years. For every 100 females, there were 103.5 males. For every 100 females age 18 and over, there were 106.3 males.

There were 1,170 housing units at an average density of 96.6 per square mile, of the occupied units 665 (61.5%) were owner-occupied and 416 (38.5%) were rented. The homeowner vacancy rate was 1.9%; the rental vacancy rate was 4.8%. 1,522 people (61.1% of the population) lived in owner-occupied housing units and 929 people (37.3%) lived in rental housing units.

2000
At the 2000 census there were 2,398 people, 1,016 households, and 667 families in the CDP. The racial makeup of the CDP was 91.45% White, 2.50% Black or African American, 1.54% Native American, 0.79% Asian, 0.08% Pacific Islander, 1.29% from other races, and 2.34% from two or more races. 3.25% of the population were Hispanic or Latino of any race.
Of the 1,016 households 32.3% had children under the age of 18 living with them, 49.6% were married couples living together, 11.4% had a female householder with no husband present, and 34.3% were non-families. 27.3% of households were one person and 6.7% were one person aged 65 or older. The average household size was 2.32 and the average family size was 2.80.

The age distribution was 24.3% under the age of 18, 9.5% from 18 to 24, 26.2% from 25 to 44, 28.0% from 45 to 64, and 12.0% 65 or older. The median age was 39 years. For every 100 females, there were 103.4 males. For every 100 females age 18 and over, there were 101.2 males.

The median household income was $35,648 and the median family income was $50,000. Males had a median income of $38,107 versus $21,815 for females. The per capita income for the CDP was $17,299. About 9.5% of families and 14.4% of the population were below the poverty line, including 11.6% of those under age 18 and 6.5% of those age 65 or over.

Politics

References

Census-designated places in Plumas County, California
Census-designated places in California